The Collette Hoard was found in fields near Berwick-upon-Tweed, Northumberland, England by metal detectorist John Minns in April 2005. The hoard is named after Collette, the eight-year-old daughter of Minns, rather than the location it was found at, in order to keep the find location secret.

The hoard included six gold lock rings, believed to have been hair decorations, as well as bracelets, rings and pins and also six socketed axes which could have been used either for woodworking or as weapons, and the first socketed gouge – a tool which would have been used by craftsmen – to be found in Northumberland.

See also
 List of hoards in Britain

References

Hoards of jewellery
Treasure troves of Bronze Age Britain
Archaeological sites in Northumberland
Treasure troves in England
2005 in England
Metal detecting finds in England
2005 archaeological discoveries